Foggo is a town in Nigeria.

Foggo may also refer to:

Kyle Foggo (born 1954), an American intelligence officer involved in the Cunningham scandal
George Foggo (1793–1869), an English historical painter, brother of James
James Foggo (1789–1860), an English historical painter, brother of George
James G. Foggo III (born 1959), U.S. Navy Vice Admiral, 6th Fleet commander
Mark Foggo (born 1950), an English ska musician